In folklore, Jack o' Legs (also spelled Jack O'Legs) is a giant from Hertfordshire, England. Jack is said to have been an archer who, like Robin Hood, robbed the rich to give to the poor. His supposed grave is in the churchyard of Holy Trinity Church, Weston.

Legend

According to local legend, Jack  lived in a cave in a wood at Weston near the mediaeval town of Baldock. When one year there was a poor harvest the Baldock bakers raised the price of flour, so Jack ambushed the bakers and gave the flour to his friends in Weston. In revenge, the bakers caught and blinded him. They gave him a final wish. Jack asked to be pointed in the direction of Weston, so he could shoot an arrow with his bow. Where the arrow landed, he wished to be buried. The bakers gave him his huge bow which nobody else could pull. He shot his arrow three miles, into the churchyard of Holy Trinity Church, Weston, which is where he was buried.

Basis
Jack has many similarities to Jack in the Green or the Green Man, a popular figure from English folklore derived from prechristian fertility cults. He preferred living in caves and woodland and had a disregard for authority. There are also similarities to the woses or wildmen carved inside many English churches, but unusually in this instance Jack is the hero rather than a sidekick similar to Little John.

The representation of the Bakers of Baldock may be a satire on the Knights Templar who founded the town. This monastic order would have been able to dictate bread prices because they owned the banks, the surrounding farmland, the flour mills, and the marketplace. They also had the power to punish thieves and outlaws.

History
A polemical poem attacking Cardinal Wolsey, Speak Parrot, by John Skelton, written c. 1521, mentions that "The gibbett of Baldock was made for Jack Leg". Baldock was founded c. 1148, so the legend dates from after that time. The practice described in the legend of capturing and locally executing a person caught in the act of stealing, called infangthief, is early mediaeval. Nathanael Salmon recorded the legend in his 1728 History of Hertfordshire.

Legacy
The field on the site of Jack's cave is called 'The Cave' and the neighbouring field is called 'Weston Wood'. A steep incline on the Great North Road near Graveley is called "Jack’s Hill". There is a Jack o' Legs storyboard sign on Weston village green. Tring Brewery brews an ale named after Jack o' Legs.

References

External links

 Mysterious Britain Gazetteer - The Mysterious Sites of Hertfordshire
 The Giant Jack O'Legs (animated story)

Burials in Hertfordshire
Legendary English people
History of Hertfordshire
People from North Hertfordshire District
Baldock
English giants
Robin Hood
Medieval legends